Oliver Lederer (born 2 January 1978) is an Austrian football manager and a former player who coaches Austria national under-15 football team.

Coaching career
On 30 July 2020, he was appointed manager of the Austria national football team for the players born in 2006 (at that time, Under-15).

References

1978 births
Living people
Association football midfielders
Austrian footballers
Austrian Football Bundesliga players
SK Rapid Wien players
FC Admira Wacker Mödling players
First Vienna FC players
Patraikos F.C. players
LASK players
Austrian football managers
FC Admira Wacker Mödling managers
Austrian Football Bundesliga managers
SKN St. Pölten managers
Austrian expatriate footballers
Expatriate footballers in Greece
Austrian expatriate sportspeople in Greece